Daraunda Assembly constituency is an assembly constituency in Siwan district in the Indian state of Bihar.

Overview
As per Delimitation of Parliamentary and Assembly constituencies Order, 2008, No. 109 Daraunda Assembly constituency  is composed of the following: Daraunda and Siswan community development blocks; Phalpura, Laheji, Mandrauli, Mandarapali, Sahuli, Telkhthu, Hasanpura, Pakadi,
Rajanpura and Harpur Kotwa gram panchayats of Hasanpura CD Block.

Daraunda Assembly constituency is part of No. 18 Siwan (Lok Sabha constituency).

Members of Legislative Assembly

Election results

2020 

In the 2019 elections and in the 2011 by election necessitated by the death of the sitting MLA, Jagmato Devi, Kavita Singh of JD(U) defeated Parameshwar Singh of RJD.

In the 2015 state assembly election BJP Candidate Jitendra Swami, Jitendra Swami (NDA) Alliance Social Leader Jitendra Swami participated in Daraundha assembly.

References

External links
 

Assembly constituencies of Bihar
Politics of Siwan district